Dolichognatha raveni is a species of long-jawed orb weaver in the spider family Tetragnathidae. It is found in New Guinea and Australia (Queensland).

References

Tetragnathidae
Articles created by Qbugbot
Spiders described in 2008